Claude Boucher (born September 2, 1942) is a former Quebec political figure. He represented Johnson in the Quebec National Assembly from 1994 to 2007 as a member of the Parti Québécois.

He was born in Bromptonville, Quebec (now Sherbrooke, Quebec), the son of Edgar A. Boucher and Yvette Lecours, and was educated at the Université de Sherbrooke. He was employed in the fields of health, education and social services and was manager at the CLSC in Sherbrooke. Boucher was mayor of Saint-Denis-de-Brompton and served as prefect for the Regional County Municipality of Val-Saint-François. He was defeated when he ran for reelection in the 2007 provincial election.

His son Étienne-Alexis served in the Quebec National Assembly from 2008-2012, as the member for Johnson.

References 
 

1942 births
Living people
Parti Québécois MNAs
Politicians from Sherbrooke
21st-century Canadian politicians